Vertigo Bluff is a prominent rock bluff (1,950 m) located 4 nautical miles (7 km) south of Asquith Bluff on the west side of Lennox-King Glacier. Rock samples were collected at the bluff by John Gunner and Henry Brecher of the Ohio State University Geological Expedition, 1969–70. The name suggested by Gunner reflects the precipitous nature of the bluff face.

Cliffs of the Ross Dependency
Shackleton Coast